The 15th Legislative Assembly of British Columbia sat from 1921 to 1924. The members were elected in the British Columbia general election held in December 1920. The British Columbia Liberal Party, led by John Oliver, formed the government.

Alexander Malcolm Manson served as speaker until January, 1922, after which Frederick Arthur Pauline succeeded him as speaker.

Members of the 15th General Assembly 
The following members were elected to the assembly in 1920.:

Notes:

Party standings

By-elections 
By-elections were held for the following members appointed to the provincial cabinet, as was required at the time:
 Alexander Malcolm Manson, Attorney General and Minister of Labour, acclaimed April 10, 1922
 William Henry Sutherland, Minister of Public Works, elected April 10, 1922

By-elections were held to replace members for various other reasons:

Notes:

Other changes 
Vancouver City(res. Malcolm Archibald Macdonald October 17, 1921, to contest the 1921 Federal Election)

References 

Political history of British Columbia
Terms of British Columbia Parliaments
1921 establishments in British Columbia
1924 disestablishments in British Columbia
20th century in British Columbia